St Leonards is a coastal township near Geelong, Victoria, Australia, at the eastern end of the Bellarine Peninsula and the northern end of Swan Bay.

The town is surrounded by salt marsh wildlife reserves which provide habitat for hundreds of birds, including the critically endangered orange-bellied parrot of which there are less than 200 in the wild. Salt marshes are one of the most biologically productive habitats on the planet, rivalling tropical rainforests. St. Leonards has also just been nominated to have the cleanest beaches in Victoria.

St Leonards is positioned centrally to many local wineries and eateries of the Bellarine Peninsula.

History

The development of St Leonards began as a source of firewood for Melbourne by George Ward Cole in 1855. To further this endeavour required the building of a pier and the town consisted of a hotel, store and six houses in 1858. The first Hotel in St Leonards was established in 1858. The Post Office opened on 19 March 1860. St Leonards State School No. 866 opened in October 1874.

Features 
St Leonards is home to good sailing waters, an Esplanade memorial recording the landfalls of Matthew Flinders in 1802 and John Batman in 1835, Edwards Point Wildlife Reserve, and bay and pier fishing.

In the Christmas Holidays St Leonards reaches a population of 4,000 people or more

It also maintains consistent calm waters as the town's location on the Bellarine Peninsula helps protect it from the bay's typical year round south west winds. Thus whilst large waves may be pounding on the east side of Port Phillip Bay due to strong south west winds, the water could be rather calm at St Leonards.

Parks 
 Port Phillip Heads Marine National Park (Swan Bay section)
 Edwards Point Wildlife Reserve
 Duck Island
 Salt Lagoon State Nature Reserve
 St Leonards Lake Reserve

Sport 
Golfers play at the course of the St Leonards Golf Club on Ibbotson Street (the golf club moved to new premises at Ibbotson Street in September 2011).

Other clubs include the St Leonards Cricket Club, St Leonards Tennis Club, St Leonards Bowling Club, St Leonards Yacht Club, the Bellarine Sharks AFC (2008 GRFA Division 3 League Champions) and formerly from 1985-1994 the St. Leonards Football Club, nicknamed 'The Saints'

References

Ian WYND, Balla-Wien: A History of the Shire of Bellarine, Shire of Bellarine (1988).

External links
 Edwards Point Wildlife Reserve Parks Victoria
 Swan Bay - Port Phillip Heads National Park (Marine)
 Swan Bay (Birds)

Towns in Victoria (Australia)
Coastal towns in Victoria (Australia)
Bellarine Peninsula
Suburbs of Geelong